John A. Brieden III (born 1955) is an American politician and businessman who served as the National Commander of The American Legion from 2003 to 2004.

Early life and education 
Brieden was born in 1955 and educated at the Calallen High School in Corpus Christi, Texas. After graduating from high school, he moved to College Station to attend the Texas A&M University where he roomed with future Texas Governor Rick Perry. He served in the United States Army for close to five years on active duty, leaving the service with the rank of Captain. Brieden later moved to Brenham, Texas where he opened a State Farm Insurance office.

The American Legion 
On August 28, 2003, Brieden was elected National Commander of The American Legion. As such, he directed the nation's largest wartime veterans' organization, representing the interests of 2.8 million U.S. veterans. During his term of office, he lobbied for veterans' benefits and continued support for POW/MIA programs.

Political career 
Long involved in Republican party politics, Brieden in 2010 decided to run for Judge of Washington County, Texas. He would go on to defeat his opponent, Joel Romo, in the March 2010 Republican primary with 3,337 votes (56.1%) to 2,608 votes (43.9%). He then won the general election over Democrat John Muegge in the November with 6,895 (65.7%) votes to 3,598 (34.3%).

Brieden was re-elected without opposition in 2014 and retired in 2018.

Military awards 
Brieden's decorations include the following:

See also 
List of people from Texas
List of Texas A&M University people

References

Further reading

External links 

1955 births
21st-century American businesspeople
21st-century American politicians
Calallen High School alumni
County judges in Texas
Insurance agents
Living people
National Commanders of the American Legion
People from Freer, Texas
Recipients of the Soldier's Medal
Texas A&M University alumni
Texas Republicans
United States Army officers
United States Army Rangers
Military personnel from Texas